The Krastata Kazarma (cross-shaped barracks) is a former military facility of the Ottoman Empire. The barracks got its name due to its cross-shaped architecture. It is one of the cultural memorials of the region of Vidin, Bulgaria, today.

The building, constructed by Polish architects, was finished in 1801. It was used by four separate units, also by a unit of the Janissaries.

After liberation the building was used as court of law and as an accommodation building by the Bulgarian army. Today it houses the ethnographical section of the "Konaka" Museum.

References

External links
 Кръстатата казарма (Bulgarian)

Barracks in Bulgaria
Military history of the Ottoman Empire
Ottoman period in the history of Bulgaria
History of Vidin
Museums in Vidin
Infrastructure completed in 1801